The C. K. Henry Building is an historic building at 309 Southwest 4th Avenue in downtown Portland, in the U.S. state of Oregon. The building was added to the National Register of Historic Places in 1982.

See also
 National Register of Historic Places listings in Southwest Portland, Oregon

References

Buildings and structures completed in 1909
Chicago school architecture in Oregon
National Register of Historic Places in Portland, Oregon
Southwest Portland, Oregon